All the Light in the Sky is an American drama film directed by Joe Swanberg and written by Swanberg and Jane Adams, who also stars in the film, along with Sophia Takal, Kent Osborne, Lawrence Michael Levine, Larry Fessenden, and Lindsay Burdge. The film had its world premiere at the AFI on November 3, 2012. The film was released on video on demand on December 3, 2013, before being released in a limited release on December 20, 2013, by Factory25.

Premise
The film follows Marie (Jane Adams), an actress struggling with the prospect of aging, which becomes all the more apparent when her 25-year-old, aspiring actress niece Faye (Sophia Takal) arrives for a weekend stay.

Cast
 Jane Adams as Marie
 Sophia Takal as Faye
 Kent Osborne as Dan
 Lawrence Michael Levine as Larry
 Larry Fessenden as Rusty
 Lindsay Burdge as Suzanne

Production
Director Joe Swanberg served as the film's cinematographer and editor.

Release
The film had its world premiere on November 3, 2012, at the AFI Film Festival. In November 2013, it was announced, Factory25 had acquired distribution rights to the film.  It was released on video on demand on December 3, 2013, prior to a limited release on December 20, 2013.

Reception
All the Light in the Sky has been positively received by critics. The film holds a 78% approval rating on Rotten Tomatoes. Andrew Barker, writing for Variety, wrote that the film delivered "clever pacing, solid technique and a deeply soulful lead performance from co-scripter Jane Adams". It has a 62/100 on Metacritic.

References

External links
 

2012 films
2012 drama films
American drama films
American independent films
2010s English-language films
Films directed by Joe Swanberg
2012 independent films
Films about actors
2010s American films